It's A New Day Tonight is the second studio album by Canadian musician Michael Rault. It was released on May 18, 2018 under Daptone Records.

Accolades

Critical reception
It's A New Day Tonight was met with generally favorable reviews from critics. At Metacritic, which assigns a weighted average rating out of 100 to reviews from mainstream publications, this release received an average score of 77, based on 8 reviews.

Track listing

References

2018 albums
Daptone Records albums